The Sefid Zakhor gas field is an Iranian natural gas field that was discovered in 2007. It began production in 2007 and produces natural gas and condensates. The total proven reserves of the Sefid Zakhor gas field are around 11.4 trillion cubic feet (326×109m3) and production is slated to be around 1.15 billion cubic feet/day (33×106m3).

References

Natural gas fields in Iran